Glenn Warren may refer to:
 Glenn E. Warren (born 1943), American politician in the New York State Assembly
 Glenn B. Warren (1898–1979), American mechanical engineer, business executive and inventor